= Michael True =

American professor and poet

- Born: 1933
- Died: 2019 (aged approximately 86)
- Occupation: Professor

Michael True (1933 - 2019) was an English literature professor and poet based in Worcester, Massachusetts.

External videos
- 2012 interview with True

== Works ==
- Daniel Berrigan: Poetry, Drama, Prose (1988, editor)
- An Energy Field More Intense Than War: The Nonviolent Tradition in American Literature (1995)
